Edmonton-Belmont was a provincial electoral district in Alberta, Canada, mandated to return a single member to the Legislative Assembly of Alberta using the first past the post method of voting from 1971 to 1993.

History
The Edmonton-Belmont electoral district was created prior to the 1971 Alberta general election from the Edmonton North East electoral district.

The Edmonton-Belmont electoral district was abolished in the 1993 boundary redistribution and was combined with a small portion of Edmonton-Beverly to form Edmonton-Manning electoral district.

Members of the Legislative Assembly (MLAs)

Election results

1971 general election

1975 general election

1979 general election

1982 general election

1986 general election

1989 general election

See also
List of Alberta provincial electoral districts
Belmont, Edmonton, a neighbourhood in north east Edmonton

References

Further reading

External links
Elections Alberta
The Legislative Assembly of Alberta

Former provincial electoral districts of Alberta
Politics of Edmonton